Geeldora Road is the road that links between Badhan and the historical city of Laasqoray in Somaliland.

The condition of the road is very poor. It was built by the locals in the late 1970s to link the towns of Badhan and Laasqoray.

After the civil war, the road was in bad state but, in late 2008, locals organized to fix some damaged sections.

External links

LaasqorayNET
Maakhir.com
Dhahar Online
Badhan Online

Transport in Somaliland